Vigo is a city in Pontevedra, Spain.

Places
Associated with the Spanish city:
 Vigo (comarca), surrounding Vigo
 Vigo metropolitan area centred on Vigo
 Ria de Vigo, an estuary
 Vigo Village, Kent, England, a village and civil parish
 Vigo, Walsall, West Midlands, England
 Vigo, Birtley, Tyne and Wear, England
 Vigo, Indiana, an unincorporated community
 Vigo County, Indiana, United States
 Vigo Township, Knox County, Indiana
 Vigo, Ohio, United States, an unincorporated community
 Vigo Street, London

People and fictional characters
 Vigo (name)

Other uses
 , four Royal Navy ships
 Battle of Vigo (disambiguation)
 University of Vigo, in Spain
 Vigo Collegiate Institute, a former private school in Terre Haute, Indiana
 Vigo RC, a rugby club based in the city of Vigo
 CD Vigo FS, a former futsal club based in the city
 Vigo Ordnance Plant, a former US Army weapons plant in Indiana
 Seventh generation of the Toyota Hilux series of commercial vehicles, also known as Vigo in some countries
 Vigo, an Indiana-based producer of pharmaceuticals for animals, now Zoetis

See also
 Vigo di Fassa, a municipality in Trentino, Italy
 Vigo di Ton, a village in the municipality of Ton, Trentino, Italy
 Viggo, a given name
 Wigo (disambiguation)